Russell Smith is a former British slalom canoeist who competed from the mid-1980s to the early 1990s.

He won a gold medal in the K-1 team event at the 1987 ICF Canoe Slalom World Championships in Bourg St.-Maurice.

References
Overview of athlete's results at CanoeSlalom.net

British male canoeists
Living people
Year of birth missing (living people)
Medalists at the ICF Canoe Slalom World Championships